Hugo Konongo (born 14 February 1992) is a professional footballer who plays as a defender for St-Pryvé St-Hilaire. Born in France, he represents the Republic of the Congo at international level.

Club career
Konongo joined Clermont Foot in 2014. He made his full professional debut in a 1–0 Ligue 2 victory over Le Havre in September 2014.

On 8 January 2018, Konongo joined the Bulgarian top league team Cherno More on trial. A month later, he was approved and signed a professional contract. On 17 February, he made his debut in a 1–4 home defeat by Beroe.

On 11 July 2019, Konongo signed a one-year contract with Romanian club Sepsi OSK. On 17 January 2020, he was released by Sepsi OSK. In June 2020, Konongo joined French team Béziers.

References

External links
 
 
 Hugo Konongo foot-national.com Profile

1992 births
Living people
Footballers from Toulouse
Republic of the Congo footballers
Republic of the Congo international footballers
Ligue 2 players
First Professional Football League (Bulgaria) players
Liga I players
Clermont Foot players
US Créteil-Lusitanos players
CS Sedan Ardennes players
ES Paulhan-Pézenas players
PFC Cherno More Varna players
Sepsi OSK Sfântu Gheorghe players
Expatriate footballers in Bulgaria
Expatriate footballers in Romania
Association football defenders
French sportspeople of Republic of the Congo descent
Black French sportspeople